Yann-Erik Randa Bahezre de Lanlay (born 14 May 1992) is a Norwegian footballer who plays as a winger for Viking in Eliteserien.

Club career

Early years
De Lanlay was born in Norway to a French father and Norwegian mother, and is therefore eligible to play for both countries. He began playing football for Vaulen IL when he was five years old. Already then he stood out with his great technique. It was early noticed his ability to escape tricky situations with his exceptional ball handling. At the age of 8 he was already noticed by the local press who were reporting on a local indoor tournament. In 2006, he was picked for Statoil's football academy, where he played with Hull's Markus Henriksen, Molde's Ruben Gabrielsen and ex-teammate Christian Landu Landu. After having great success for his team he was during the summer of 2007 picked up by Viking FK.

Viking
De Lanlay came to Viking from Vaulen as a 15-year-old. He became a part of Viking's talent programme, under the leadership of Gary Goodchild. Here he also played with his three years older Brother Even de Lanlay. He was also considered a substantial talent, but had to cut down due to a knee injury. Yann-Erik was picked for the first team squad ahead of the 2010 season and made his first team debut 17 October 2010 against Odd Grenland. During the winter of 2011 de Lanlay began playing regularly for the first team, and he scored his first goal against Fredrikstad in a 2–0 victory.

In October 2013, de Lanlay signed a new contract with Viking, binding him to the club until the end of the 2016 season.

Rosenborg
At 17 July 2015, Rosenborg announced that they had agreed with Viking for a transfer. De Lanlay signed a four-year contract with Rosenborg.

Return to Viking
On 23 December 2019, de Lanlay returned to Viking, signing a four-year contract with the club.

International career
De Lanlay was first called up for the Norwegian national team for the friendly matches against South Africa and Zambia in January 2013, and made his debut when he replaced Erik Huseklepp as a substitute at half time in the 1–0 victory against South Africa.

Career statistics

Club

International

Scores and results list Norway's goal tally first.

Honours

Club
Rosenborg
Norwegian League (4): 2015, 2016, 2017, 2018
Norwegian Football Cup (3): 2015, 2016, 2018

References

External links

1992 births
Living people
Sportspeople from Stavanger
Association football wingers
Norwegian people of French descent
Norwegian footballers
Norway under-21 international footballers
Norway international footballers
Viking FK players
Rosenborg BK players
Eliteserien players